The Doushantuo Formation (formerly transcribed as Toushantuo or Toushantou, from ) is a geological formation in western Hubei, eastern Guizhou, southern Shaanxi, central Jiangxi, and other localities in China. It is known for the fossil Lagerstätten in Zigui in Hubei, Xiuning in Anhui, and Weng'an in Guizhou, as one of the oldest beds to contain minutely preserved  microfossils, phosphatic fossils that are so characteristic they have given their name to "Doushantuo type preservation". The formation, whose deposits date back to the Early and Middle Ediacaran, is of particular interest because it covers the poorly understood interval of time between the end of the Cryogenian geological period and the more familiar fauna of the Late Ediacaran Avalon explosion, as well as due to its microfossils' potential utility as biostratigraphical markers. Taken as a whole, the Doushantuo Formation ranges from about 635 Ma (million years ago) at its base to about 551 Ma at its top, with the most fossiliferous layer predating by perhaps five Ma the earliest of the 'classical' Ediacaran faunas from Mistaken Point on the Avalon Peninsula of Newfoundland, and recording conditions up to a good forty to fifty million years before the Cambrian explosion at the beginning of the Phanerozoic.

Sedimentology

The whole sequence sits on an unconformity with the underlying Liantuo formation, which is free of fossils, an unconformity usually being interpreted as a period of erosion. On that unconformity lie tillites of the Nantuo formation - cemented glacial till formed of glacial deposits of cobbles and gravel laid down at the end of the Marinoan glaciation (also known as Varangian glaciation, this is the second and last of a series of very extensive glaciations during a period called the Cryogenian -- named because 'Snowball Earth' conditions at the time). This latest Cryogenian glacial level is tentatively dated ca 654 (660 ± 5) — 635 Ma (million years ago).

The Doushantuo formation itself has three layers representing aquatic sediments that formed as sea levels rose with the melting of worldwide glaciation. Biomarkers indicate highly saline conditions, such as might be found in a lagoon, low oxygen levels, and very little sediment that had been washed off land surfaces.

The richest finds (the Lagerstätte itself) lie at the bottom of the middle stratum, with a date about 570 Ma, thus from some time after the great Gaskiers glaciation of [585 ± 1 - 582.1 ± 0.4 Ma].

Fossils

Doushantuo fossils are all aquatic, microscopic, and preserved to a great degree of detail. The latter two characteristics mean that the structure of the organisms that made them can be studied at the cellular level, and considerable insight has been gained into the embryonic and larval stages of many early creatures. One contentious claim is that many of the fossils show signs of bilateral symmetry, a common feature in many modern-day animals which is usually assumed to have evolved later, during the Cambrian Explosion. A nearly microscopic fossil animal, Vernanimalcula ("springtime micro-animal") was announced in October 2005, with the claim that it was the oldest known bilateral animal. However, the absence of adult forms of almost all animal types in the Doushantuo (there are microscopic adult sponges and corals) makes these claims difficult to prove: some argue that their lack suggests these finds are not larval and embryonic forms at all; supporters contend that some unidentified process "filtered out" all but the smallest forms from fossilization. An alternative interpretation suggests that it was created by non-biological rock-forming processes. The team that discovered Vernanimalcula have defended their conclusion that it was an animal, pointing out that they found ten specimens (not illustrated) of the same size and configuration, and stating that non-biological processes would be very unlikely to produce so many specimens that were so alike.

The discovery was made when the rich phosphate deposits were being mined, and was first reported in 1998. The finds offer direct evidence that confirms expectations that major evolutionary diversification of animals already had occurred before the onset of the Cambrian period, with its apparent 'explosion' of metazoan life-forms and, therefore, that more remote ancestral forms of the phyla recognizable in Cambrian macrofossils must have existed previously.

The documented biota now includes phosphatized microfossils of algae, multicellular thallophytes (seaweeds), acritarchs, ciliates, and cyanophytes, besides adult sponges and adult cnidarians (coelenterates; these may be early forms of tabulate corals (tetracorallians)). There also seem to be what scientists cautiously report as bilateral animal embryos, termed Parapandorina, and eggs (Megasphaera). Some of the possible animal embryos are in an early stage of cellular division (that was first interpreted as spores or algal cells), including eggs and embryos which are most probably of sponges or cnidarians, as well as adult sponges and a variety of adult cnidarians.

An alternative possibility is that the "embryos" and "eggs" are in fact fossils of giant sulfur bacteria resembling Thiomargarita, a bacterium so large that it is visible to the naked eye. The interpretation would also provide a mechanism for phosphatic fossilization through microbially mediated phosphate precipitation by the bacteria, which has been observed in modern environments.  If dark spots in the fossil transpire to be fossilised nuclei - an unlikely claim - this would refute the Thiomargarita hypothesis. That being said, recent comparisons of the Doushantuo fossils to modern decaying Thiomargarita and expired sea urchin embryos shows little similarity between the fossils and decaying bacterial cells.

Only about one-twentieth of the site's fossils have been excavated. The fossil beds are threatened by increasing intensity of phosphate mining operations in the area. A workshop led in protest by local paleontologists resulted in a temporary halt to the mining in 2017.

Palaeogeography 
The formation was laid down on a carbonate shelf, whose rim enclosed a lagoon between tidal flats on the shore, and the deeper ocean.  This lagoon was periodically anoxic or euxinic (containing hydrogen sulfide); variations in the chemistry in the lagoon can be detected in isotopic and elemental abundance cycles in the rock and possibly contributed to the fossil preservation.

Geochemistry
The most recent Doushantuo rocks show a sharp decrease in the 13C/12C carbon isotope ratio. Since this change appears to be worldwide but its timing does not match that of any other known major event such as a mass extinction, it may represent "possible feedback relationships between evolutionary innovation and seawater chemistry" in which metazoans (multi-celled organisms) removed carbon from the water, which increased the concentration of oxygen, and the increased oxygen level made possible the evolution of new metazoans.

See also
 Phosphatic fossilization

Footnotes

References

Knoll, A. H., 2003. Life on a Young Planet. Princeton Univ. Press.

External links 
 Brief overview of Doushantuo formation.

Geologic formations of China
Proterozoic Eonothem of Asia
Ediacaran Asia
Ediacaran geology
Phosphorite formations
Lagerstätten
Fossiliferous stratigraphic units of Asia
Paleontology in Guizhou
Geography of Guizhou
Proterozoic animals
Neoproterozoic
Ediacaran life